Roman Aleksandrovich Petushkov (born 18 February 1978) is a Russian cross-country skier, biathlete, and Paralympian. He competes in classification category sitting events.

Career 
Petushkov participated at the 2010 Winter Paralympics in cross-country skiing and biathlon. In cross-country skiing, he took the silver in the 15 km, sitting. He placed 5th in the 1 km sprint and 5th in the 10 km, sitting. In biathlon, he took the bronze medal in the 12.5 km individual, sitting. He placed 20th in the men's 2.4 km pursuit, sitting. In 2014 he competed at the Paralympic Games where he won six gold medals.

After his success at the 2014 Winter Games, Petushkov received numerous national and international awards and honors. In 2015, he was nominated Sportsperson of the Year with a Disability. For his performance at the 2014 Games, Petushkov was awarded Best Male at the Paralympic Sports Awards.

Awards 
 Order "For Merit to the Fatherland", 4th class (2014)
 Medal of the Order "For Merit to the Fatherland", 2nd class (26 March 2010) — for his contribution to the development of physical culture and sports at the 10th Paralympic Games in 2010 in Vancouver (Canada)
 Merited Master of Sports of Russia
 "Sportsman of the Month" (International Paralympic Committee, in January 2012 and February 2013)
 Laureate of "Quirk of Fate" (Russian Paralympic Committee, 2013)

References

External links 
 

Russian male cross-country skiers
Russian male biathletes
Paralympic biathletes of Russia
Paralympic cross-country skiers of Russia
Biathletes at the 2010 Winter Paralympics
Cross-country skiers at the 2010 Winter Paralympics
Paralympic silver medalists for Russia
Paralympic bronze medalists for Russia
1978 births
Living people
Biathletes at the 2014 Winter Paralympics
Medalists at the 2010 Winter Paralympics
Medalists at the 2014 Winter Paralympics
Paralympic gold medalists for Russia
Paralympic Sport Awards — Best Male winners
Paralympic medalists in cross-country skiing
Paralympic medalists in biathlon
21st-century Russian people
20th-century Russian people